The Shyness Clinic is a clinic founded in the late 1970s by Dr. Philip Zimbardo at Stanford University. Its goal is to research cognitive traits in people with shyness and to offer treatment programs for those specific impairments. It was later moved to the community of Palo Alto, California. The clinic follows a "social fitness model", which encourages people to exercise socially.

References

 The Shy Break Free – Chicago Tribune
 Facing fears helps shyness, experts say
 Timidity troubles?(help for shy businesspeople)(Brief Article) | HighBeam Business: Arrive Prepared

External links
 Official Website

Clinics in California
Shyness
Medical and health organizations based in California